Globe One Digital is a European digital marketing agency, founded in 1997 by Dimitris K. Papoutsis and headquartered in Athens, providing online marketing strategies and services.

Overview 

Globe One Digital implements strategies in digital marketing performance applied by the use of search engines and digital technologies (SEO & SEM) and specializes in Search Engine Marketing (Google Ads, SEO), Social Media Marketing, PPC Advertising, CRO, Website Design and Development, Mobile Services and Travel Performance Marketing.

History 

Since it started operating (1997) Globe One Digital has developed digital marketing strategies and websites for clients like Stoiximan and Betano, Grecotel Hotels and Resorts, MediaMarkt, Travelive, Coca-Cola HBC, SWOT Hospitality Management Company, Zeus International, Allianz, Greek National Opera, Suzuki Bulgaria, Domino's Pizza Bulgaria.

In 2011, the agency became a Google Certified Partner and in 2013 it won its first award in Digital Marketing .

In 2014, Globe One Digital had five YouTube Masthead Blasts in a row. At the Google Travel Forum the vice president of Google Travel presented  the global case study of AirFastTickets. In the same year, the agency became a Μember of GRECA and SETE. Also in June 2014 it became a Member of IAB Hellas (Interactive Advertising Bureau).

In 2015, the agency became a Μember of EDEE.

In 2016, Globe One Digital ranked 81st on the “2016 Inc. 5000 Europe” list of fastest growing private companies in Europe, 1st in Greece and 5th in Europe for Advertising & Marketing, with a growth rate of 853% in the previous three fiscal years. In the same year, the Globo PLC project became a LinkedIn global case study.

One year later (2017) the Greek agency expanded its business activity in Bulgaria and Romania and became a Member of Hellenic Business Council in Bulgaria (H.B.C.B.).

In 2020, Globe One Digital certified as "Google Digital Champion" in Smart Bidding for its digital marketing services.

Work 
 
In 2014 the company begins to contribute to technological and artistic domestic events by participating and supporting them with sponsorships and initiatives. Also, the Globe One Digital adopted and developed Corporate Social Responsibility strategies on behalf of non-profit organizations and institutions in Greece. As a first step, the agency began supporting the NGO “Smile of the Child” by conducting Google AdWords Campaigns to increase their digital presence and raise public awareness. In the last decade the agency has been awarded in Digital Marketing competitions that take place in Greece. During the period 2013–2019, Globe One Digital won nine Gold awards for its services and strategies in digital marketing, nine Silver and seven Bronze.  In 2021 company won the "Best Of The Decade - Top 10 Agency Of The Decade (e-volution awards 2011-2020)" in Greece award.

References 

1997 establishments in Greece